Charmoy is the name of the following communes in France:

 Charmoy, Aube, in the Aube department
 Charmoy, Saône-et-Loire, in the Saône-et-Loire department
 Charmoy, Yonne, in the Yonne department

See also
Charmois (disambiguation)